Quiripi (pronounced , also known as Mattabesic, Quiripi-Unquachog, Quiripi-Naugatuck, and Wampano) was an Algonquian language formerly spoken by the indigenous people of southwestern Connecticut and central Long Island, including the Quinnipiac, Unquachog, Mattabessett, Podunk, Tunxis, and Paugussett (subgroups Naugatuck, Potatuck, Weantinock). It has been effectively extinct since the end of the 19th century, although Frank T. Siebert, Jr., was able to record a few Unquachog words from an elderly woman in 1932.

Affiliation and dialects
Quiripi is considered to have been a member of the Eastern Algonquian branch of the Algonquian language family. There appear to have been two major dialects of Quiripi: an "insular" dialect spoken on Long Island by the Unquachog and a "mainland" dialect spoken by the other groups in Connecticut, principally the Quinnipiac.

Attestation
Quiripi is very poorly attested, though some sources do exist. One of the earliest Quiripi vocabularies was a 67-page bilingual catechism compiled in 1658 by Abraham Pierson, the elder, during his ministry at Branford, Connecticut, which remains the chief source of modern conclusions about Quiripi. Unfortunately, the catechism was "poorly translated" by Pierson, containing an "unidiomatic, non-Algonquian sentence structure." It also displays signs of dialect mixture. Other sources of information on the language include a vocabulary collected by the Rev. Ezra Stiles in the late 1700s and a 202-word Unquachog vocabulary recorded by Thomas Jefferson in 1791, though the Jefferson vocabulary also shows clear signs of dialect mixture and "external influences." Additionally, three early hymns written circa 1740 at the Moravian Shekomeko mission near Kent, Connecticut, have been translated by Carl Masthay.

Phonology
Linguist Blair Rudes attempted to reconstitute the phonology of Quiripi, using the extant documentation, comparison with related Algonquian languages, as "reconstructing forward" from Proto-Algonquian. In Rudes' analysis, Quiripi contained the following consonant phonemes:

Quiripi's vowel system as reconstituted by Rudes was similar to that of the other Southern New England Algonquian languages.

Orthography
 a – 
 â – 
 ch – 
 h – 
 i – 
 k – 
 m – 
 n – 
 o – 
 ô – 
 p – 
 r – 
 s – 
 sh – 
 t – 
 u – 
 w – 
 y –

References

Bibliography
  (2007). "The Dialectology of Southern New England Algonquian." In Papers of the 38th Algonquian Conference, ed. H. C. Wolfart. Winnipeg: University of Manitoba, pp. 81–127
  (1978). "Eastern Algonquian Languages." In Northeast, ed. Bruce G. Trigger. Vol. 15 of Handbook of North American Indians, ed. William C. Sturtevant. Washington, D.C.: Smithsonian Institution, pp. 70–77
  (1999). The Languages of Native North America. Cambridge: Cambridge University Press
  (1980). Some Helps for the Indians 1658 Bilingual Catechism, reprinted in "Language and Lore of the Long Island Indians," Readings in Long Island Archaeology and Ethnohistory, Vol. IV. Stony Brook, NY: Suffolk County Archaeological Association.
  (1997). "Resurrecting Wampano (Quiripi) from the Dead: Phonological Preliminaries." Anthropological Linguistics (39)1:1-59
  (1978). "Indians of Southern New England and Long Island: Early Period." In Northeast, ed. Bruce G. Trigger. Vol. 15 of Handbook of North American Indians, ed. William C. Sturtevant. Washington, D.C.: Smithsonian Institution, pp. 160–176

External links 
OLAC resources in and about the Quiripi language
 Quiripi language

Eastern Algonquian languages
Languages of the United States
Extinct languages of North America
Indigenous languages of the North American eastern woodlands
Languages extinct in the 1900s